Leti (or Letti) is an Austronesian language spoken on the island of Leti in Maluku. Although it shares much vocabulary with the neighboring Luang language, it is marginally mutually intelligible.

Fewer than 1% of Leti speakers are literate in Leti, though between 25% and 50% of them are literate in another language.

Varieties 

The main dialectological division in Leti is between eastern varieties, spoken in the domains of Laitutun and Luhuleli, and western varieties, spoken in the domains of Batumiau, Tutukei, Tomra, and Nuwewang. This article focusses on the Tutukei variety and is based on a descriptive study by Aone van Engelenhoven (2004), a Dutch linguist of Leti descent. Tutukei itself divides into two sociolects,  i.e. 'village language' ( 'language',  '(walled) village'), and  i.e. 'city language' ( 'language',  'city').

Both of them prominently feature lexical parallelism.

Per van Engelenhoven 2004, "the major issue in formal Leti discourse is to keep speaking as long as possible. Indeed, the important element in 'royal speech' is not what is said, but rather how it is said and how long it takes to be said". In particular  features formulaic pairs of clauses which are syntactically identical, each pair of corresponding words in the two clauses forming a lexical pair.

It employs a repertoire of approximately 150 Luangic-Kisaric words with distinctive sound changes: e.g. Often borrowings from Malay are inserted as well. Again per van Engelenhoven 2004, "in Southwest Malukan society turn-taking in singing is ritualized and as such a fixed strategy, which makes it a powerful rhetoric device in Leti discourse.   [...] [A] song may not be interrupted when performed. Singing is thus a means to prevent interruption in a speech event or an instrument to surpass the other speech participants".

Phonology

Consonants 

Vowels 

These vowels can also occur long; the phonemic status of long vowels hangs on the interpretation of Leti's pervasive metathetic processes.

The mid vowels  are restricted to the penult of lexical morphemes, which is stressed. However, the contrast is set up synchronically on account of certain exceptions ( 'he, she',  'refuse',  'stay'), and the fact that when suffixed the conditioning vowel can disappear: 
 'dry' →  'it dries first'
 'descend' →  'he descends first'

Phonological processes 

Metathesis and apocope, together binding processes, are pervasive in Leti as a feature of combinations of morphemes. The preferred "flow of speech" in Leti seems to involve chains of CCV units.

The free form of any Leti morpheme always features a final vowel, so those whose bound forms end in consonants feature two allomorphs which are related by CV metathesis. Thus 'skin, fly (n.), fish, bird' have bound forms  (the latter two with long vowels) but free forms .

When a morpheme whose bound form ends in a vowel is prefixed to another component, that final vowel may apocopate or metathesise into the following component. CV metathesis happens when the metathesising vowel is high and is followed by at most one consonant and a non-high vowel. The metathesised vowel is realised as a glide,  written as ï ü. Thus  'chicken + egg' becomes  'chicken egg',  1st sing. pronoun + 'go' becomes  'I go'. In other contexts apocope happens, unless this would leave an illicit three-consonant cluster. So  'chicken + bone' becomes  'chicken bone',  'cat + tongue' becomes  'cat's tongue'.

A similar metathesis is found with the nominaliser, historically an infix -in-, but now taking the form -nï- among many other allomorphs (detailed more below): thus  'sew' derives  'needle'.

Grammar

Morphology 

Human nouns pluralise with the third person plural pronominal clitic -ra, which must follow another suffixed element:  'woman',  'the woman',  'the women'. Nonhuman nouns pluralise by repetition:  'horse',  'horses'.

Leti has four possessive suffixes, which undergo binding. 

The vowel V in the first person plural and third person suffix copies the last vowel of its base.

Nouns can be zero-derived to verbs: e.g.  'roof' →  'he roofs' or 'it has a roof'.

Nominal compounding is highly productive as a derivational process. For example  +  'king' + 'big' →  'emperor',  +  'goat' + 'shed' →  'goat shed',  +  'ribbon' + 'man' →  'man's ribbon',  'buttocks' + 'cucumber' →  'cockroach',  +  reduplicated 'ship' + 'fly' →  'airplane'.

Verbs fall into two classes according to whether their subject prefixes exhibit binding or not: those of Class I do not, those of Class II do. By default verbs are in Class II. Certain verbs are lexically in Class I (like  'advise'), together with all verbs with complex onsets ( 'cough') and denominal or causativised verbs
( 'buy', from the noun  'price'). The subject prefixes are as follows. 

Verbs with first person singular inflection necessarily take the pronoun = 'I' as a proclitic.

Some causatives are marked only by class change:  means 'float' in class II and 'make float' in class I.

The nominalising affix productively derives nouns from verbs. It takes various forms, most of which are infixes, depending on the phonological shape and the class of its base.  

Reduplication, which usually copies a root-initial CV or CVCV sequence with binding, has a variety of functions, among them adjectivisation of nouns ( 'idiot' →  'idiotic') and verbs ( 'redden' → ), derivation of nouns, especially instruments ( 'sew' →  'needle'), marking atelicity, and relativising on an object ( 'he pulls' →  'which he pulls').

Vocabulary

Lexical parallelism 
Many of Leti's lexical items are organised into lexical pairs,
which are always deployed as fixed combinations in a fixed order.  
A few pairs involve adjectives or numerals, but the
vast majority consist of nouns (e.g.  'woman // man', 
 'water // stone') or verbs
(e.g.  'look // see',  'scratch / scrape').

Some words are confined to lexical pairs, 
In  the function of lexical pairs is to
highlight particular elements of a sentence, or simply to mark formality.  
When used in ordinary speech, the meanings of
lexical pairs can relate in various ways to those of their components:
  'ivory // gold', meaning 'treasure'
  'proa // sailing boat', meaning 'traditional fleet'
  'island // mainland', meaning 'archipelago'
  'hill // stone', meaning 'fort'
  'woman // man', meaning either 'married couple' or 'gender'
Or they can simply have the sense of a conjunction, e.g.
 'dog // pig' = 'the dog and the pig';
these are the only sort of conjoined phrases that do not require
the conjunction .

History 

The phones of Luangic-Kisaric continue those of 
Proto-Malayo-Polynesian according to the following sound changes (based on Mills 2010).
In Western Leti, LK  has vanished and
In Eastern Leti, LK  becomes 
and LK  becomes  in the penult before a low vowel.

Roger Mills suggests that Luangic-Kisaric retained distinct reflexes of PMP *ŋ, on the basis of other languages in the family, and *Z. Moreover, although the status of *Z as a PMP phoneme is unclear — Mills along with John U. Wolff and Robert Blust no longer admit it, realigning it with *z — the Luangic languages have no clear examples of inherited *z, despite numerous examples of *Z > .

Mills explains the metathesis found in consonant-final basis
as arising from an original echo vowel added to consonant-final forms,
e.g.  'skin' > , after which the original
post-tonic vowel was deleted, e.g. yielding  > Leti .

Jonker (1932) was the first full-scale investigation of Leti, based on a native informant and the few 19th-century works on the language then available.

Examples 
The following paragraph is the opening of the Sailfish story as told by Upa S. Manina of  house in the Ilwiaru quarters in Tutukei and reproduced in van Engelenhoven (2004). The Sailfish story is of great importance to Leti society: it provides an origin story for the Leti 'boat owner clans' of Luang origin, describing the destruction of the mythical former Luang continent and the migrations that brought its inhabitants to Leti.

References

Further reading 
 Taber, Mark (1993). "Toward a Better Understanding of the Indigenous Languages of Southwestern Maluku." Oceanic Linguistics, Vol. 32, No. 2 (Winter, 1993), pp. 389–441. University of Hawai'i.

Languages of Indonesia
Timor–Babar languages